Boye is a county in south-central Hebei province, China.

Administrative divisions
There are 3 towns and 4 townships under the county's administration.

Towns:
Boye, Xiaodian, Chengwei

Townships:
Dongxu Township, Beiyangcun Township, Chengdong Township, Nanxiaowang Township

References

 
Geography of Baoding
County-level divisions of Hebei